A triangle fan is a primitive in 3D computer graphics that saves on storage and processing time. It describes a set of connected triangles that share one central vertex (unlike the triangle strip that connects the next vertex point to the last two used vertices to form a triangle), possibly within a triangle mesh. This is a considerable improvement over the  vertices that are necessary to describe the triangles separately. The graphics pipeline can take advantage by only performing the viewing transformations and lighting calculations once per vertex. Triangle fans are deprecated in Direct3D10 and later.

Any convex polygon may be triangulated as a single fan, by arbitrarily selecting any point inside it as the center.

See also
 Triangle strip
 Fan triangulation

References

Computer graphics